Tearing Through is a 1925 American silent action film directed by Arthur Rosson and starring Richard Talmadge, Kathryn McGuire, and Herbert Prior. It was released in Britain in 1926 by Ideal Films.

Plot
As described in a film magazine review, Richard Jones, assistant to the district attorney, volunteers to round up a ring of drug peddlers. He finds his rival for the hand of Constance Madison is in charge of the hop joint. He rescues Constance from the clutches of his rival and brings the peddlers in. He then learns that the District Attorney is involved in the hop ring. He becomes the new district attorney and also Constance's husband.

Cast

References

Bibliography
 Robert B. Connelly. The Silents: Silent Feature Films, 1910-36, Volume 40, Issue 2. December Press, 1998.

External links

 

1925 films
1920s action films
American silent feature films
American action films
American black-and-white films
Film Booking Offices of America films
Films directed by Arthur Rosson
1920s English-language films
1920s American films